Charles John Samuel Thompson (27 August 1862 – 14 July 1943) MBE was a British physician and writer.

Thompson was educated at University of Liverpool where he studied chemistry and pharmacy. In 1909 he became the curator for the Wellcome Institute for the History of Medicine. In 1927 he was elected by the Royal College of Surgeons of England as honorary curator of the Historical Section at their museum in Lincoln's Inn Fields. Most of the collection was destroyed during World War II attacks in May 1941.

He was well educated in toxicology and was the author of the book Poisons and Poisoners (1931). He was a member of the Royal Society of Medicine.

Publications

The Mysteries of Sex: Women Who Posed as Men and Men Who Impersonated Women (1974)
History and Evolution of Surgical Instruments (1942)
The Mystic Mandrake (1934)
Alchemy and Alchemists (1932)
Poisons and Poisoners (1931)
The Mystery and Lore of Monsters (1930)
The Art of the Apothecary (1929)
Quacks of Old London (1928)
The Mystery and Lure of Perfume (1927)
The Mysteries & Secrets of Magic (1927)
Poison Mysteries in History, Romance and Crime (1924)
Zorastro, A Romance (1899) as "Creswick J Thompson"
Poison Romance and Poison Mysteries (1899)
Notes on Pharmacy and Dispensing for Nurses (1898)
The Mystery and Romance of Alchemy and Pharmacy (1897)
The Hand of Destiny: Folklore and Superstition for Everyday Life (1893)
Practical Dispensing for Students, Pharmaceutical and Medical (1891)

References

1862 births
1943 deaths
20th-century English medical doctors
Alumni of the University of Liverpool
Members of the Order of the British Empire